Arnos Vale is the name of several places:

Arnos Vale, Bristol – district of Bristol, England
Arnos Vale Cemetery – historic cemetery in Bristol, England
Arnos Vale, Saint Vincent and the Grenadines – town in Saint Vincent
Arnos Vale, Trinidad and Tobago – town in Tobago

See also Arno (disambiguation)